Lisa Walters (born January 9, 1960) is a Canadian professional golfer who played on the LPGA Tour. She competed under her maiden name Lisa Young until 1988.

Young was born in Prince Rupert, British Columbia. she won several amateur tournaments in British Columbia including three straight British Columbia Ladies' Championships. She played college golf at Florida State University where she was an All-American in 1981.

Walters joined the LPGA Tour in 1984 and won three times between 1992 and 1998.

Walters was inducted into the Canadian Golf Hall of Fame in 2008.

Amateur wins
1977 British Columbia Junior Championship
1979 British Columbia Ladies' Championship
1980 British Columbia Ladies' Championship
1981 British Columbia Ladies' Championship

Professional wins

LPGA Tour wins (3)

References

Canadian female golfers
Florida State Seminoles women's golfers
Golfing people from British Columbia
LPGA Tour golfers
People from Prince Rupert, British Columbia
Golfers from Tampa, Florida
1960 births
Living people